Ricardo Santana Ortiz (born November 21, 1958), better known as Ricky Santana, is a professional wrestler of Cuban descent who has worked for World Championship Wrestling, World Wrestling Federation, World Wrestling Council and the National Wrestling Alliance, All Japan, IWA Japan, Consejo Mundial de Lucha Libre, AAA.

Professional wrestling career
Santana debuted as a wrestler in 1980 after being trained at The Great Malenko wrestling school in south Florida. In 1985, Santana worked for NWA Texas Allstar Wrestling in San Antonio in June 1985 won the Texas Allstar Tag Team Championship as the Hoods with Tony Torres defeating Shawn Michaels and Paul Diamond, known as the American Force. In March 1986, he began wrestling in NWA Championship Wrestling from Florida, where he first met Fidel Sierra, who would later become his Tag Team partner for many years. A short time later, he went on to Portland for Pacific Northwest Wrestling.  On October 4, 1986, he won the NWA Pacific Northwest Tag Team titles with Brady Boone from Mike Miller and Abdudah Dein. He lost the titles back to them on November 10, 1986. He then won the titles with Cocoa Samoa, on January 7, 1987 but lost them to Miller and Rip Oliver in May 1987. He won the NWA Pacific Northwest Heavyweight title from Oliver in March 1987.

After he moved to the World Wrestling Council, he won the Puerto Rican Heavyweight title from Super Black Ninja in San Juan, Puerto Rico, on August 6, 1988. He lost it to Bobby Jaggers in October, but won it back on November 24, 1988. Santana won the WWC World Junior Heavyweight Championship from Profe on January 14, 1989. He lost it to Jonathon Holiday on April 2, 1989, in Caguas, Puerto Rico. Returning to the NWA, he won the Pacific Northwest Television Championship from Al Madril in February 1990. He also won the tag team titles four times with various partners between May 1990 and February 1991.

In August 1991, Santana went to Japan for W*ING under the masked persona, the Iceman. After W*ING folded in 1994, he would use the Iceman gimmick in various Japanese promotions, including IWA Japan and Big Japan Pro Wrestling.

Back in the WWC, he won the World Junior Heavyweight title from Mr. Pogo, on April 20, of either 1990 or 1991. He claimed the championship again from Brad Anderson in May 1991, in Caguas, Puerto Rico. Santana won the WWC Caribbean Tag Team Championships twice, both times with Ray Gonzalez as the Latin Connection. He then won the World Tag Team titles twice with Rex King, on December 25, 1991 and February 29, 1992. He reunited with Gonzalez to win the world titles twice, in February and April 1993. Ortiz won the WWC Television title from Sean Morley, in either 1994 or 1995. He won the World Tag Team titles with Fidel Sierra in 1995, and the Television title from Sweet Brown Sugar in March 1996. Santana and Gonzalez won the World Tag Team titles from Sean Morley and Shane Sewell in May 1996, and Santana won them again with La Ley, in March 1997. He won the WWC Puerto Rican Heavyweight Championship twice, in September and November 1997. In March 1998, he won the World Tag Team titles again, this time with Shane Sewell.

In the Catch Wrestling Association, he won the World Tag Team Championship with Black Navy Seal from Michael Kovac and Dirk Rotzek, on November 27, 1999. Santana won the IWA World Tag Team Championship twice, in January and March 2000. Between 2001 and 2003, Ortiz won the WWC World Tag Team titles three times, the Caribbean Heavyweight Championship twice, and the Television and Puerto Rican Heavyweight titles once each.

Santana has also worked with the creative side as Head of creative for WWC Puerto Rico and IWA Puerto Rico on different occasions throughout the 1990s. Santana was Agent for WCW and WWE from 1999 till 2001.

Championships and accomplishments
Catch Wrestling Association
CWA World Tag Team Championship (1 time) - with Black Navy Seal
Cauliflower Alley Club
Men's Wrestling Award (2020)
International Wrestling Association
IWA World Tag Team Championship (2 times) - with Sean Morley (1) and Sean Hill (1)¨
IWA North American Heavyweight Championship (1 time)
NWA Hollywood
NWA Americas Tag Team Championship (1 time) - with The Spoiler
NWA Los Angeles Tag Team Championship (1 time) - with Ron Starr
Pacific Northwest Wrestling
NWA Pacific Northwest Heavyweight Championship (1 time)
NWA Pacific Northwest Tag Team Championship (6 times) - with Coco Samoa (1), Brady Boone (1), Al Madril (1), Brad Anderson (2) and Curtis Thompson (1)
NWA Pacific Northwest Television Championship (1 time)
Ring Around The Northwest Newsletter
Tag Team of the Year (1990) with Curtis Thompson
World Wrestling Council
WWC Caribbean Heavyweight Championship (2 times)
WWC Caribbean Tag Team Championship (2 times) - with Ray Gonzalez
WWC Puerto Rico Heavyweight Championship (5 times)
WWC Television Championship (3 times)
WWC World Junior Heavyweight Championship (3 times)
WWC World Tag Team Championship (11 times) - with Ray González (3), Rex King (2), Fidel Sierra (2), La Ley (1), Brent Dail (1), Glamour Boy Shane (1) and Rico Suave (1)

Luchas de Apuestas record

References

1958 births
Living people
Professional wrestling trainers
20th-century professional wrestlers
21st-century professional wrestlers
WWC Puerto Rico Champions
WWC Television Champions
NWA Americas Tag Team Champions